The Palisades (or the Palisade Group) are a group of peaks in the central part of the Sierra Nevada in the U.S. state of California. The peaks in the group are particularly steep, rugged peaks and "contain the finest alpine climbing in California."

Situation
Josiah Whitney in his book Geology, Volume 1 writes:
"At the head of the north fork, along the main crest of the Sierra, is a range of peaks, from 13,500 to 14,000 feet high, which we called 'the Palisades.' These were unlike the rest of the crest in outline and color, and were doubtless volcanic; they were very grand and fantastic in shape."

Although referred to by early geologists as "volcanic", the Palisades are a dark granitic rock. On the northeast side of the group lie the Palisade Glacier and the Middle Palisade Glacier, the largest glaciers in the Sierra Nevada. These glaciers feed Big Pine Creek.

Notable peaks of the group include four independent fourteeners:
 North Palisade, 
 Mount Sill, 
 Split Mountain, 
 Middle Palisade, 
and the following mountains in addition:
 Mount Agassiz, the northwesternmost peak of the group before Bishop Pass.
 Birch Mountain, which juts out further towards the Owens Valley than the rest of the group.
 Norman Clyde Peak, 
 Palisade Crest, 
 Mount Gayley, 
 Temple Crag, known for its many rock climbing routes.
 Mount Winchell, 
 The Thumb, also known as "East Palisade."

References

External links 

 

Climbing areas of California
Mountains of Kings Canyon National Park
Mountains of Fresno County, California
Mountains of Inyo County, California
North American 4000 m summits